Bernard James "Benny" Friel (16 September 1941 – 16 February 2010) was a Scottish footballer who played for Dumbarton and Southend United.

References

1941 births
Scottish footballers
Dumbarton F.C. players
Southend United F.C. players
Scottish Football League players
2010 deaths
Footballers from Glasgow
English Football League players
Association football inside forwards
Vale of Leven F.C. players
Scottish Junior Football Association players